Mayak is a village and municipality in the Beylagan Rayon of Azerbaijan. 726 nafar aholi istiqomat qiladi.

References 

Populated places in Beylagan District